Bidak (also Romanized as Bīdak; also known as Kalāteh-ye Bīdak) is a village in Kuh Hamayi Rural District, Rud Ab District, Sabzevar County, Razavi Khorasan Province, Iran. At the 2006 census, its population was 31, in 8 families.

References 

Populated places in Sabzevar County